This is a list of cricketers who have played matches for the Gujranwala cricket team.

 Imran Abbas
 Hassan Adnan
 Ijaz Ahmed
 Shakeel Ahmed
 Nadeem Ahsan
 Shakeel Ansar
 Naved Arif
 Khalid Butt
 Zulfiqar Butt
 Aleem Dar
 Munir Dar
 Inam-ul-Haq
 Majeed Jahangir
 Mujahid Jamshed
 Azhar Khan
 Tahir Mahmood
 Shoaib Malik
 Tahir Mughal
 Asim Munir
 Shahid Nazir
 Abdur Rehman
 Zahid Saeed
 Aamer Wasim

References 

Lists of Pakistani cricketers